Tapinoma rasenum is a species of ant in the genus Tapinoma. Described by Smith and Lavigne in 1973, the species is endemic to Puerto Rico.

References

Tapinoma
Hymenoptera of North America
Insects described in 1973